Tôn Thất Thuyết (尊室説; 12 May 1839 in Huế – 1913 in Longzhou) was the leading mandarin of Emperor Tự Đức of Vietnam's Nguyễn dynasty. Thuyết later led the Cần Vương movement which aimed to restore Vietnamese independence under Emperor Hàm Nghi. He fled to China seeking political refuge after Hàm Nghi's capture by France, and later died in Longzhou, Guangxi.

References 
 

 

1839 births
1913 deaths
Nguyen dynasty officials
Vietnamese nationalists
Vietnamese revolutionaries
Date of death missing
Place of death missing